The Judiciary of Bangladesh ( — ) or Judicial system of Bangladesh ( — ) is based on the Constitution and the laws are enacted by the legislature and interpreted by the higher courts. Bangladesh Supreme Court is the highest court of Bangladesh. The jurisdiction of the Supreme Court of Bangladesh has been described in Article 94(1) of the Constitution of Bangladesh. It consists of two divisions, the High Court Division and the Appellate Division. These two divisions of the Supreme Court have separate jurisdictions. 

The Bangladeshi judiciary faces a severe shortage of judges. As of July 2017, 1,268 judges deal with over 2.7 million cases in lower courts, 86 High Court justices deal with 431,000 cases and 6 Supreme Court justices deal with 13,000 cases.

Supreme Court

Chief Justice

The Chief Justice of Bangladesh is the chief amongst the judges of the Supreme Court of Bangladesh, and also head of the whole judicial establishments, including subordinate courts. The chief justice is appointed by the President of Bangladesh. The Chief Justice sits in the Appellate Division of the Supreme Court with other judges to hear and decide cases, presides over meetings of the full Supreme Court to transact business relating to administration of the court, and supervises the discipline of the judges and magistrates of the subordinate courts.

Appellate Division
The Supreme Court of Bangladesh has two divisions namely the Appellate Division and the High Court Division (HCD). The Appellate Division hears both civil and criminal appeals from the High Court Division. The Appellate Division may also decide a point of law reserved for its decision by the High Court Division, as well as any point of law of public interest arising in the course of an appeal from a subordinate court to the High Court Division, which has been reserved by the High Court Division for the decision of the Appellate Division.

High Court Division
The High court division of the Supreme court consists of Civil courts, Criminal courts and some Special courts.

District Courts

Civil Courts
Five civil courts exist in this hierarchy:
 District Judge Court
 Additional District Judge Court
 Joint District Judge Court
 Senior Assistant Judge Court
 Assistant Judge Court

Criminal Courts
Two types of Criminal Courts exist in this hierarchy:

District Sessions Courts
 District Session Judge Court
 Additional District Session Judge Court
Joint District Session Judge Court

Magistrate Courts
 Chief Judicial Magistrate Court
 Additional Chief Judicial Magistrate Court
 Senior Judicial Magistrate Court
 Judicial Magistrate Court

City Criminal Courts

As of 2022 only the flowing six cities have metropolitan courts:
Dhaka
Chittagong
Rajshahi
Khulna
Sylhet
Gazipur

Generally, Metropolitan court deals the criminal offenses occur in the metropolitan area. Currently, only Metropolitan Sessions courts are found in Bangladesh. Metropolitan Court doesn't deal with Civil cases. Thus Metropolitan courts are of 2 subtypes of session or criminal. Those are:

Metropolitan Sessions Courts

 Metropolitan Session Judge Court
 Additional Metropolitan Session Judge Court
Joint Metropolitan Session Judge Court:

Metropolitan Magistrates Courts

 Chief Metropolitan Magistrate Court
 Additional Chief Metropolitan Magistrate Court
 Metropolitan Magistrate Court

Specialized Courts and Tribunals
 Constitutional Court
 None
Administrative Court 
 Administrative Tribunals
Finance Court
 Money Loan Courts
 Insolvency Courts
 Income Tax Appellate Tribunals
 Special Tribunal for Share Market Scam
Labour Court
 Labour Courts
Court of Justice
 International Crimes Tribunal
Social Court
 Druto Bichar Tribunal
 Bangladesh Cyber Tribunal

Bangladesh Judicial Service Association

Bangladesh Judicial Service Association (BJSA)(Bengali: বাংলাদেশ জুডিসিয়াল সার্ভিস এসোসিয়েশন (বিজেএসএ) is a professional association of Judges and Magistrates of Bangladesh. The Association headquarters is located in Dhanmondi, Dhaka.

Md. Helal Chowdhury, the District and Sessions Judge Dhaka, is the current President and Bikash Kumar Saha, Joint Secretary at the Ministry of Law, Justice and Parliamentary Affairs, is the Secretary-General of the Association.

References 

 
Politics of Bangladesh